Ayrums (in Persian often as Âyromlū) are a Turkic tribe, considered to be a sub-ethnic group of Azerbaijanis after the nineteenth and twentieth centuries. They have been historically associated with the area nearby the city of Gyumri (in present-day Armenia).

History
In 1828, after the signing of the Treaty of Turkmenchay by which Iran lost the khanates (provinces) of Erivan and Nakhchivan, Iranian Crown Prince Abbas Mirza invited many of the Turkic tribes that would be otherwise subjected to rule by the Russian Empire to move inside Iran's newly-established borders. The Ayrumlu were one of them and were settled in Avajiq, a district to the west of Maku. They are associated with numerous villages in Iran's West Azerbaijan Province and are completely sedentary in contemporary times.

During the late 19th and the early 20th centuries, some more migrated to Iran and Turkey. The Ayrums also live in the westernmost reaches of the present-day Republic of Azerbaijan, where they live as a semi-nomadic people. At least six towns in northwestern Azerbaijan and northeastern Armenia have been named after the tribe: Ayrum, Mets Ayrum, Bağanis Ayrum, Quşçu Ayrım, Yuxarı Ayrım, Mollaayrım.

There is no relation between Ayrums and the Greek Orthodox Turkic-speaking Urum people. The confusion is rooted in the lack of the Turkic sound "-ı" in Persian and its consequent representation by "-u".

Notable Ayrums 
 Teymur Khan Ayromlou, General in the Persian Army, father-in-law of Reza Pahlavi
 Tadj ol-Molouk Ayromlou, Queen Consort of Iran, wife of Reza Pahlavi, mother of Mohammad Reza Pahlavi
 Mohammad-Hosayn Ayrom, General in the Persian Cossack Brigade
 Mahmoud Khan Ayrom, General in the Persian Cossack Brigade
 Yusuf Ziya Ayrımlı, Senator of the Republic of Turkey (Kars, June 7, 1964 - October 14 1979) in the TBMM
 Şamil Ayrım, Member of the Grand National Assembly of Turkey

See also 
 Turkic peoples
 Battle of Ganja (1804)

References 

Azerbaijani tribes
Ethnic groups in Iran
Ethnic groups in Azerbaijan
Ethnic groups in Turkey
Ethnic groups in Turkmenistan
Oghuz tribes